Carlos Fernando Savio (born May 1, 1978 in Montevideo, Uruguay) is a Uruguayan footballer currently playing for Rentistas of the Segunda Division in Uruguay.

Teams
  Rentistas 2000-2005
  Tiro Federal 2005
  Rentistas 2006
  Cobresal 2007
  Rentistas 2008–present

References
 
  

1978 births
Living people
Uruguayan footballers
Uruguayan expatriate footballers
C.A. Rentistas players
Tiro Federal footballers
Cobresal footballers
Expatriate footballers in Chile
Expatriate footballers in Argentina
Association football defenders